Composition with Yellow Lines is an abstract painting on canvas by Dutch artist Piet Mondrian. While following the grid like structures of his other abstract paintings, it is unusual in omitting the use of any black lines. Indeed, Mondrian's earlier writings on art had stated that any lines in his paintings had to be black; colour was reserved for the filled in rectangles. The painting is equally unusual in that none of the lines meet. He did not paint any further paintings with this design element until his move to New York in 1940.

The painting sometimes receives the title Lozenge Composition with yellow lines because of the diamond, or lozenge, shape that the painting has.

Composition with Yellow Lines hangs in the Kunstmuseum, The Hague. The painting was presented to the museum in 1933 after a group of artists organised a public collection of funds to purchase it.

A 2007 musical piece for clarinet and piano by the composer Stuart Greenbaum is based on the painting and has the same name.

References 

Modern paintings
De Stijl
1933 paintings
Paintings by Piet Mondrian
Collections of the Kunstmuseum, The Hague